Edgar Marutlulle (born 20 December 1987) is a South African rugby union player for the  in Super Rugby and the  in the Rugby Challenge. His usual position is hooker.

Career

Youth

He went to Potchefstroom High School for Boys and therefore represented  youth level. He was included in their Under-18 Craven Week sides in both 2004 and 2005. In 2004, he was also included in a South African Schools team that played against their South African Academy counterparts. In 2005, he also represented the  side in the 2005 Under-19 Provincial Championship.

The following year, he was included in the South African Under-19 squad that competed at the 2006 Under 19 Rugby World Championship in the United Arab Emirates, finishing eighth in the competition. He once again played at Under-19 level for the Leopards in the Provincial Championship in 2006 and progressed to the Under-21 side in 2007 and 2008. He was included in the ' senior squad for the 2008 Vodacom Cup competition, but failed to make an appearance. He also represented a South African Students side that played against .

UJ / Golden Lions

In 2009, Marutlulle moved to Johannesburg, where he joined university side  for the 2009 Varsity Cup season. He made seven appearances for the side as they narrowly missed out on a semi-final spot. However, he was once again included in the South African Students squad that faced their American counterparts in matches in Stellenbosch and Cape Town.

In 2011, he made the step up to Super Rugby level when he was included in the  squad for the 2011 Super Rugby season.

Return to Leopards

However, he rejoined the  prior to the 2012 Currie Cup First Division season on a two-year deal. He established himself as the first-choice hooker right away, starting 11 of their 15 matches during the season and made a further two appearances off the bench.

He was included in the  squad for the 2013 Super Rugby season. He made four appearances from the bench in the first four games of the season, but lost his place when first Hannes Franklin and then Virgile Lacombe were preferred to him. He again made thirteen appearances during the Leopards' 2013 Currie Cup First Division campaign.

Again, first-choice hooker during the 2014 Vodacom Cup competition, Marutlulle made seven starts as they finished fifth in the Northern Section.

Eastern Province Kings

He signed a deal with the Eastern Province Kings in a deal until the end of 2015. In June 2014, he was selected in the starting line-up for the  side to face  during a tour match during a 2014 incoming tour. He played for the first 72 minutes of the match as the Kings suffered a 12–34 defeat. He played in seven matches of the Kings' Currie Cup season as they returned to the Premier Division of the competition in 2014; he started the first six matches of the season before sustaining a shoulder injury that ruled him out for the next three weeks. He returned to the side for their final match of the season and appeared as a second-half substitute to help his side beat the  26–25 to secure their only win of the season.

South Africa 'A'

In 2016, Marutlulle was included in a South Africa 'A' squad that played a two-match series against a touring England Saxons team. He didn't play in their first match in Bloemfontein, but was named on their bench for the second match of the series in George, and came on in the second half of a 26–29 defeat.

Blue Bulls

After the 2016 Super Rugby season, Marutlulle moved back north, joining the Pretoria-based  on a three-year deal.

References

South African rugby union players
Living people
1987 births
Eastern Province Elephants players
Southern Kings players
Golden Lions players
Lions (United Rugby Championship) players
Leopards (rugby union) players
People from Boksburg
Rugby union hookers
Rugby union players from Gauteng